Roche-lès-Clerval (literally Roche near Clerval) is a commune in the Doubs department in the Bourgogne-Franche-Comté region in eastern France.

Geography

Population

See also
 Clerval
 Communes of the Doubs department

References

External links

 Roche-lès-Clerval on the regional Web site 

Communes of Doubs